Beskid was a series of economy hatchback car prototypes in Poland designed by BOSMAL Automotive Research and Development Center during 1982-1986. The design team was led by Wiesław Wiatrak who later used Beskid as his daily car and finally passed it to a museum in Kraków.

The car never went into mass production; However, it is also suggested that Beskid was in fact a back-up measure if licensing talks were unsuccessful; finally Fiat Cinquecento was produced in FSM. While all seven Beskid prototypes were slated for destruction, six were saved. One was used for crash test, and remaining six are located in various institutions in Poland:

 Museum in Warsaw - Yellow 
 Muzeum Inżynierii Miejskiej in Kraków - Two, white and green
 Politechnika Opolska - White
 Muzeum Techniki i Komunikacji in Szczecin - Green
 BOSMAL museum at BOSMAL facility in Bielsko Biała - Cream

The body style was patented, but BOSMAL lacked funds for the extension of the patent. 

The name comes from the Beskids mountains.

External links
BOSMAL website
Bosmal Beskid 106 prototype - history and pictures (English)

References

Cars of Poland
Science and technology in Poland
Hatchbacks